Mickey's Covered Wagon is a 1933 short film in Larry Darmour's Mickey McGuire series starring a young Mickey Rooney. Directed by Jesse Duffy, the two-reel short was released to theaters on November 30, 1933 by Post Pictures Corp.

Plot
After helping an elderly friend of theirs, Mickey and the gang are rewarded with everything they need to go out mining as prospectors. Throughout an expedition 'out west' Stinkey Davis continuously tries to sabotage the kids' wagons. After finally getting rid of Stinkie, a storm begins to approach. The gang takes refuge in nearby deserted house, which is thought to be haunted.

Cast
In order by credits:
Mickey Rooney - "Mickey McGuire"
Douglas Scott - "Stinkey Davis"
Marvin Stephens - "Katrink"
Jimmie Robinson - "Hambone Johnson"
Billy Barty - Billy McGuire ("Mickey's Little Brother")
Shirley Jeane Rickert - "Tomboy Taylor"
Spencer Bell - Sam, Stinkey's chauffeur

External links 
 

1933 films
1933 comedy films
American black-and-white films
Mickey McGuire short film series
1933 short films
American comedy short films
1930s English-language films
1930s American films